The Bluebird Theater (originally known as the Thompson Theater) is a theater in Denver, Colorado. The theater was designed by Harry W.J. Edbrooke and built during 1913–1914. It was renamed in 1922. It is currently used as a live music venue.

It was listed on the U.S. National Register of Historic Places in 1997.

History 

The Bluebird Theater was built in 1913 and originally named after the prominent Denver grocer and druggist, John Thompson. The theater was renamed in 1922 and became an important part of the community. The theater was also initially a movie house and went through various phases over the years. In 1994, Chris Swank and Evan Dechtman invested in the Bluebird and it re-opened as a live music venue, as it remains today. The theater is laid out in tiers with a balcony overlooking the entire space.
In 2006, AEG Live took over the Bluebird Theater and made significant upgrades.

Noted performers

Aaron Carter
Adele
Better Than Ezra
Blaqk Audio
Bowling for Soup
Butch Walker
Ed Sheeran
Eric Hutchinson
Faithless
The Fratellis
Father John Misty
Grace VanderWaal
Hanson
Herb Alpert
Hot Chelle Rae
Hot Hot Heat
Kimbra
Lindsey Stirling
Lucero
Lucinda Williams
Macklemore & Ryan Lewis
Manic Street Preachers
Mutemath
Needtobreathe
Oasis
Owl City
Portugal. The Man
Rooney
Scissor Sisters
Snow Patrol
Stereophonics
Tame Impala
Twenty One Pilots
Vampire Weekend
Whiskeytown
White Rabbits
Yelawolf
Jamie xx

External links
Bluebird Theater's Google+

References

Theatres completed in 1914
Music venues in Colorado
Theatres in Denver
Buildings and structures in Denver
Late 19th and Early 20th Century American Movements architecture
National Register of Historic Places in Denver
Theatres on the National Register of Historic Places in Colorado